Francisco Llera Blanco (born January 18, 1981 in Ribadesella) is a Spanish sprint canoer who has competed since the mid-2000s. He won two gold medals in the K-1 4 x 200 m event at the ICF Canoe Sprint World Championships (2009, 2010).

Llera also finished sixth in the K-2 500 m event at the 2004 Summer Olympics in Athens.

References
 Canoe09.ca profile
 

1981 births
Canoeists at the 2004 Summer Olympics
Living people
Olympic canoeists of Spain
Spanish male canoeists
ICF Canoe Sprint World Championships medalists in kayak
Mediterranean Games silver medalists for Spain
Mediterranean Games medalists in canoeing
Competitors at the 2005 Mediterranean Games
21st-century Spanish people